"None of Your Concern" is a song by American singer Jhené Aiko, released as the second single on November 15, 2019 for her third studio album Chilombo (2020). The song features American rapper Big Sean and uncredited vocals from Ty Dolla Sign.

Background 
The song is the second collaboration between Jhené Aiko and Big Sean since they broke up, the first being on Sean's song "Single Again". The ex-couple reflect on their failed relationship and decide how to move on. Sean talks about the pain of seeing Aiko move on and how he misses her.

Charts

Certifications

References 

2019 singles
2019 songs
Jhené Aiko songs
Big Sean songs
Def Jam Recordings singles
American contemporary R&B songs
Songs written by Jhené Aiko
Songs written by Big Sean